Robert Dillon Browne (1811 – 1 July 1850) was an Irish Repeal Association politician.

Browne was born in County Mayo and educated at Trinity College, Dublin.  

References

External links
 

UK MPs 1835–1837
UK MPs 1837–1841
UK MPs 1841–1847
UK MPs 1847–1852
Members of the Parliament of the United Kingdom for County Mayo constituencies (1801–1922)
Irish Repeal Association MPs
1811 births
1850 deaths
Politicians from County Mayo
Alumni of Trinity College Dublin